Jam.py is a Low-code development platform for database-driven business web applications, based on DRY principle, with emphasis on CRUD.

Jam.py is free and open-source low-code/no-code "full stack" WSGI rapid application development framework for the JavaScript and Python programming language.
The server component runs on any computer with Python 2.6 or later.

It offers a built-in web server, GUI builder and database access for third-party databases.

Features 
 Single distribution which runs with both Python 2.6+ and 3.x
 Can run as a standalone web development server or be used with any web server which supports WSGI
 Built-in GUI builder called Application Builder
 Support for JSON client data (for REST and JavaScript clients)
 Support for popular databases Oracle Database, Microsoft SQL Server, PostgreSQL, SQLite, MySQL, Firebird (database server), SQLCipher

Example 
The following code shows a simple web application that displays "Hello World!" when visited: 

Task/client module:
task.create_menu($("#menu"), $("#content"), {
    splash_screen: '<h1 class="text-center">Hello World!</h1>',
    view_first: true
});

PythonAnywhere 

PythonAnywhere Python 3.x deployment is supported

Awards 
 2015. 10 Best Frameworks for Web Design
 2016. 35 Best HTML5 and CSS3 Responsive Frameworks

Notes

References

See also

 Flask (web framework)
 Pylons project
 Web2py
 Django (web framework)
 Comparison of web frameworks
 List of low-code development platforms

External links 
 

Free software programmed in Python
Python (programming language) web frameworks